Alipate Fatafehi (born 13 December 1984) is a Tongan rugby union player who plays for Lyon OU in the Top 14 and the Tonga national team. Fatafehi first played professional rugby for Otago in New Zealand from 2006-2008 but failed to secure a regular spot in the team, dropping down to the North Otago side for two games in 2008 before gaining a spot in the team for Otago's last game of 2008. His primary position is on the wing, although he played at fullback for Otago and more recently in line with global trends, has been used as a centre because of his size.

Stormers
After finishing his season in 2008 he was called over to South Africa to have a trial with the Super Rugby franchise the Stormers. In his first match against the Boland Cavaliers he started on the left wing, playing well before sent to the sin bin for a dangerous tackle. After much promise he failed to be selected for the Super 14 squad for the 2009 Super 14 season, but signed a contract with the Western Province to play in the 2009 Vodacom Cup.

North Harbour
In 2010, Fatafehi played for North Harbour in the 2010 Air New Zealand Cup. Despite playing a big role in the team's 2010 season, he was unable to secure a Super Rugby contract at the end of the season.

CA Saint-Étienne
In late 2010, Fatafehi signed with French club CA Saint-Étienne for the French 2010-11 Rugby Pro D2 season.

Tonga
Fatafehi has also been a member of the Tonga Sevens team. He competed for Tonga at the 2011 Rugby World Cup.

References
 
 Otago Daily Times

External links 
 

1984 births
Living people
Lyon OU players
Tongan rugby union players
Rugby union wings
Tonga international rugby union players
North Otago rugby union players
Expatriate rugby union players in France
Expatriate rugby union players in New Zealand
Expatriate rugby union players in South Africa
Tongan expatriate rugby union players
Tongan expatriate sportspeople in France
Tongan expatriate sportspeople in New Zealand
Tongan expatriate sportspeople in South Africa